Metherell is a village in east Cornwall, England, United Kingdom. It is situated three miles (5 km) east of Callington and two miles west of Calstock village in Calstock civil parish.

References

Villages in Cornwall